The third season of the American Spanish-language reality television series La casa de los famosos premiered on January 17, 2023, with a live move-in on Telemundo. The show follows a group of celebrities living in a house together while being constantly filmed with no communication with the outside world as they compete to be the last competitor remaining to win the grand cash prize.

The season was announced on August 8, 2022. Héctor Sandarti and Jimena Gallego returned as hosts of the series.

Housemates 
The first housemates were announced on December 6, 2022. In addition to the regular celebrity housemates, two civilian housemates were chosen by the public to become part of the cast, making this the first season to feature civilians living in the house.

Housemate Exchange 
On March 13, 2023, a housemate exchange with Big Brother Brasil was announced. Dania will be swapped with Key Alves from Big Brother Brasil 23 on Day 58, for a to be determined amount of days. However, Alves has already evicted from Big Brother Brasil. The choice to make the exchange for a housemate who had already been evicted was made due to the rules of the Brazilian's reality show not to bring outside information into the house.

Potential civilian housemates 
On January 9, 2022, ten potential civilian housemates entered the house where the public voted for one man and one woman to join the celebrities. Samira Jalil was not chosen by the public to enter the house, however, she entered the house on Day 30 as a replacement for Monique, who withdrew from the house.

Nominations table 
Every week, each participant is called to nominate two of their housemates, with the exception of that week's Head of Household. The first person a housemate nominates is for 2 points, whilst the second nomination is for just 1 point. The four participants with highest points, are nominated for elimination and it is up to the public's vote through Telemundo.com who gets evicted that week.

: On Day 9, Monique walked out of the game for her mental health.
: Due to conspiring about nominating Pepe, Rey's points against him were voided.
: On Day 13, Raúl won the power of removing two nomination points against him.
: Due to announcing their nominations to other houseguests, Juan, Nicky and Rey's points against Pepe and Paty were voided.
: Due to discussing about which nominee to save, José did not have the power to save one of the nominees.
: On Day 25, Aristeo walked out of the game due to personal reasons.
: On Day 30, Diego and Samira entered the house as new houseguests, replacing Aristeo and Monique. They were immune from nomination and eviction and were ineligible to nominate that week.
: The HoH competition was played in pairs. Aylín and Osmel won the competition and became Co-Head of Households.
: On Day 34, Madison won the power of voiding the nominations of any housemate. She chose to void Dania's nominations.
: On Day 42, Juan walked out of the game.
: On Day 53, Diego, Paty and Raúl failed a surprise challenge and as punishment they were automatically nominated. However, on day 55, Diego won immunity for the week, while Raúl won the HoH competition on Day 57 and became immunne.

Total received nominations

Episodes

References 

2023 American television seasons